Ranch to Market Road 2222 (RM 2222) is a  ranch to market road in Travis County, Texas, maintained by the Texas Department of Transportation (TxDOT).

Route description 
RM 2222 begins at an intersection with RM 620 in west Austin in the Four Points neighborhood. Northwest of RM 620, the road is called Bullick Hollow Road and continues to the east side of Lake Travis. This section of road is a four-lane, lightly developed Texas Hill Country road. It includes Tumbleweed Hill, a half-mile ten-percent gradient hill. City Park Road, leading to the Emma Long Metropolitan Park at Lake Austin, is accessible from RM 2222 just west of Loop 360.

After crossing Loop 360, RM 2222 continues southeast  to Loop 1 (Mopac Boulevard). This section is a winding, scenic four-lane road built into the cliffs over Lake Austin. As RM 2222 approaches Loop 1, it enters a more heavily developed residential area.

After crossing Loop 1, RM 2222 continues southeast  to its termination at Spur 69, which leads to US 290 and I-35. Although the designation after Lamar Boulevard changes to Spur 69, the road is still signed as RM 2222 through to I-35. This section of road is a four-lane, heavily developed urban residential and commercial road.

RM 2222 has several names over its length. Its westernmost segment is merely called RM 2222 (although it is sometimes erroneously referred to as FM 2222 or RR 2222). As it approaches its more developed stretch west of Loop 1, RM 2222 picks up the name Northland Drive. After crossing Shoal Creek Boulevard, the name changes to Allandale Road, named for the Allandale neighborhood through which it passes. Finally, after passing Burnet Road, the name changes to Koenig Lane (pronounced KAY-nig), and remains so to the junction with I-35.

The segment of RM 2222 west of Loop 1 is designated a scenic roadway by the City of Austin.

History 
RM 2222 originally terminated at the (then) Austin city limits when it was designated on September 29, 1954; it was expanded to its current termination point at Lamar Boulevard on July 16, 1957.

In the late 1980s, the city of Austin developed plans to expand RM 2222 east of Loop 1 into an east–west freeway, SH 169, connecting with US 290. The plans were rejected in the 1990s, citing adverse effects on the environment and existing neighborhoods.

On June 27, 1995, the entire route was redesignated Urban Road 2222 (UR 2222). The designation reverted to RM 2222 with the elimination of the Urban Road system on November 15, 2018.

Junction list

See also

References

External links 
 TexasFreeway.com: Ranch to Market Road 2222 - contains description, history and photos of RM 2222

2222
Transportation in Austin, Texas
Transportation in Travis County, Texas